Bridgnorth was a parliamentary borough in Shropshire which was represented in the House of Commons of England from 1295 until 1707, then in the House of Commons of Great Britain until 1800, and in the House of Commons of the Parliament of the United Kingdom from 1801 until its abolition in 1885.

It was represented by two burgesses until 1868, when it was reduced to one Member of Parliament (MP).

Boundaries
According to the 1881 census, the borough of Bridgnorth comprised the parishes of Quatford, part of Quatt, St. Leonard and St Mary (in Bridgnorth town), Astley Abbotts, Eardingdon, Oldbury, Romsley and Tasley. This was smaller than the municipal borough, which only contained the first four.

History

By the eighteenth century Bridgnorth had one of the widest franchises in England, consisting of "the burgesses and freement within and without the borough". There were more than a thousand voters in the contested elections of 1727, 1734 and 1741 although in 1920 it was noted as 700.  Between 1661 and 1870 at least one of the MPs for Bridgnorth came from the Whitmore family.

Members of Parliament

MPs 1295–1640

MPs 1640–1868

MPs 1868–1885

Elections

Elections in the 1830s

 

 

 

 

 

 

 

 

 

 

Hanbury-Tracy resigned, by accepting the office of Steward of the Chiltern Hundreds, after a petition was lodged against his election.

Elections in the 1840s

Elections in the 1850s

 

Pigot's election was declared void on petition due to bribery, causing a by-election.

 

Whitmore was appointed a Lord Commissioner of the Treasury, requiring a by-election.

Elections in the 1860s

 

On 22 March 1866, after scrutiny, Dalberg-Acton was unseated and Whitmore was duly elected in his place.

Whitmore was then appointed a Lord Commissioner of the Treasury, requiring a by-election.

The seat was reduced to one member for the 1868 election.

Elections in the 1870s
Whitmore resigned, causing a by-election.

Elections in the 1880s

See also
Parliamentary constituencies in Shropshire#Historical constituencies
List of former United Kingdom Parliament constituencies
Unreformed House of Commons

Notes and references

Sources
Robert Beatson, A Chronological Register of Both Houses of Parliament (London: Longman, Hurst, Res & Orme, 1807) 
D Brunton & D H Pennington, Members of the Long Parliament (London: George Allen & Unwin, 1954)
Cobbett's Parliamentary history of England, from the Norman Conquest in 1066 to the year 1803 (London: Thomas Hansard, 1808) 
 David Hayton, 'The Country Party in the House of Commons 1698-1699', Parliamentary History, volume 6 (1987), 141-63

Parliamentary constituencies in Shropshire (historic)
Constituencies of the Parliament of the United Kingdom established in 1295
Constituencies of the Parliament of the United Kingdom disestablished in 1885
Bridgnorth